The following ships of the Indian Navy have been named Tir:

  is a training ship of the Indian Navy

Indian Navy ship names